The 1950–51 season was Chelsea Football Club's thirty-seventh competitive season. The club struggled throughout the season and ultimately finished 20th in the First Division. Chelsea were six points adrift at the bottom of the table with four matches remaining, but they won all four matches to avoid relegation on goal average, by 0.044 of a goal.

Table

Notes

References

External links
 1950–51 season at stamford-bridge.com

1950–51
English football clubs 1950–51 season